The Scout Association's Chief Scout is the head of its youth programmes. The role is now merely a nominal and titular ceremonial figurehead. The association's present Chief Scout is the British adventurer and TV presenter Bear Grylls.

History
Robert Baden-Powell made himself Chief Scout of his own Scouting organisation, The Boy Scouts Association. Following his death, the association appointed its Chief Scouts of the British Empire, then of the British Commonwealth and Empire, then of the Commonwealth and, since 1972, of the United Kingdom and Overseas Territories.

Association’s Chief Scouts of the British Empire and Commonwealth

 Robert Baden-Powell, 1st Baron Baden-Powell, died 8 January 1941
 Arthur Somers-Cocks, 6th Baron Somers, March 1942, The Boy Scouts Association's Chief Scout of the British Empire
 Thomas Corbett, 2nd Baron Rowallan, April 1945, The Boy Scouts Association's Chief Scout of the British Commonwealth and Empire
 Sir Charles Maclean, later Lord Maclean, September 1959, The Boy Scouts Association's Chief Scout of the Commonwealth. He resigned as The Scout Association's Chief Scout of the UK in September 1971, but continued as The Scout Association's Chief Scout of the Commonwealth until August 1975.

Association’s Chief Scouts of the United Kingdom and overseas territories

 Sir William Gladstone, July 1972
 Major-General Michael J. H. Walsh, February 1982
 Sir Garth Morrison, May 1988
 George Purdy, March 1996
 Peter Duncan, 5 September 2004
Bear Grylls, 11 July 2009

Appointment
The association's first Chief Scout, Robert Baden-Powell made himself the Chief Scout and chairman for life. The association's charter and by-laws made no provision for his removal, retirement or the appointment of a successor in either role. The association's subsequent Chief Scouts have been appointed by its council, which council elects its own members including office bearers, while others are appointed by the board of trustees (formerly committee of the council), with others nominated as representatives from councils around the United Kingdom (the majority of whose members are appointed by the board or headquarters) and overseas branches controlled by headquarters.

Changed role
Once the powerful leader of the association, the role of the association's Chief Scout was fundamentally diminished when the holder ceased to also be chairman of the Committee of the Council (now Board of Trustees) following Baden-Powell's death in 1941. Baden-Powell had made himself Chief Scout and chairman for life but, upon his death, the committee determined that it had the power to appoint subsequent Chief Scouts and chairmen. Not only were the roles separated but the committee assumed power over the roles. The role was further diminished with appointments of Chief Scouts for limited terms and diminished further still in 2009 with the functions split with the appointment of a UK Chief Commissioner (Deputy Chief Scout). The UK Chief Commissioner took over most of the administrative duties and now heads the adult leaders and administrators of the association. Reducing the capacity of the Chief Scout to make decisions on their own, a committee was appointed to work alongside them. Working alongside the association Chief Scout's Committee, the association's Chief Scout is nominally responsible for the appointment of County Commissioners and County Presidents, but this is merely ceremonially formal. The association's Chief Scout is now merely an iconic figurehead for publicity promotion of the association's youth programmes.

Awards
Each section of The Scout Association has an award nominally given on behalf of the association's Chief Scout; in Squirrels, the award is the Chief Scout's Acorn Award, in Beavers, the award is the Chief Scout's Bronze Award, in Cubs it is the Chief Scout's Silver Award, in Scouts it is the Chief Scout's Gold Award and in Explorers, the Chief Scout's Platinum and Diamond Awards. The only award higher than this is the King's Scout Award.

See also

 Silver Wolf Award
 Chief Scout (Scouting Ireland)

References

External links
 Meet the Chiefs
 The Passing Years – Milestones in the progress of Scouting.

The Scout Association